Symonds Yat railway station is a disused railway station on the Ross and Monmouth Railway constructed on the banks of the River Wye in Symonds Yat East.

History

Opened in 1873, it consisted of two platforms and a timber station building on the down platform, it closed in 1959 with the closure of the line. The railways were at first used as a quick means of bringing the boats back from Chepstow.

A camping coach was positioned here by the Western Region from 1953 to 1958; an early form of self-catering accommodation which used converted redundant railway carriages for occupation by holidaymakers who could arrive and depart by train. Today the station site has long been levelled but the foundations of the station building and platforms remain and the area now forms a car parking area for a local hotel inn.

Station site today

References

External links
 Station on 1952 OS Map
http://www.oldukphotos.com/graphics/England%20Photos/Herefordshire,%20Symonds%20Yat,%20Rail%20Station%201910%27s.jpg Photograph of the station circa 1910]
Photograph of the station site today

Railway stations in Great Britain opened in 1873
Railway stations in Great Britain closed in 1959
Former Great Western Railway stations
Disused railway stations in Herefordshire
History of Herefordshire
River Wye